Hottentotta is a genus of scorpions of the family Buthidae. It is distributed widely across Africa,  except for most of the Sahara desert. Species in the genus also occur in the Middle East, the Arabian Peninsula, southeastern Turkey, Iraq, Iran, Afghanistan, Pakistan, India, Nepal, Cape Verde Islands, and Sri Lanka (introduced).

Taxonomy
The genus was introduced in 1908 by A. A. Birula, originally as a subgenus of the genus Buthus. It was elevated to genus rank by F. Werner in 1934. Buthotus Vachon, 1949 is an often used but outdated synonym of Hottentotta.

Some authors subdivided the genus into three subgenera, Hottentotta (Hottentotta), Hottentotta (Balfourianus) Vachon, 1979, and Hottentotta (Deccanobuthus) Lourenço, 2000. The latest taxonomic reviews of this genus by F. Kovařík reject this subdivision and recognizes a single, undivided genus Hottentotta. The differences separating the closely related genus Mesobuthus from Hottentotta are very subtle and species have been often been misassigned among the two genera.

Diversity
The content of this genus may vary, depending on the authority. At least 40-41 species are known:

Hottentotta alticola (Pocock, 1895)
Hottentotta arenaceus (Purcell, 1902)
Hottentotta buchariensis (Birula, 1897)
Hottentotta caboverdensis Lourenço & Ythier, 2006
Hottentotta conspersus (Thorell, 1876)
Hottentotta finneganae Kovařík, 2007
Hottentotta flavidulus Teruel & Rein, 2010
Hottentotta franzwerneri (Birula, 1914)
Hottentotta fuscitruncus (Caporiacco, 1936)
Hottentotta gentili (Pallary, 1924)
Hottentotta hottentotta (Fabricius, 1787) (type species)
Hottentotta jabalpurensis Kovařík, 2007
Hottentotta jalalabadensis Kovařík, 2007
Hottentotta jayakari (Pocock, 1895)
Hottentotta judaicus (Simon, 1872)
Hottentotta khoozestanus Navidpour, Kovařík, Soleglad & Fet, 2008
Hottentotta lacroixi Ythier & Dupre, 2021
Hottentotta lorestanus Navidpour, Nayebzadeh, Soleglad, Fet, Kovařík & Kayedi, 2010
Hottentotta mateui Lourenço, Duhem & Cloudsley-Thompson, 2012
Hottentotta mazuchi Kovařík, 2013
Hottentotta minax (L. Koch, 1875)
Hottentotta minusalta Vachon, 1959
Hottentotta mesopotamicus Lourenço & Qi, 2007
Hottentotta niloticus (Birula, 1928)
Hottentotta pachyurus (Pocock, 1897)
Hottentotta pellucidus Lowe, 2010
Hottentotta penjabensis (Birula, 1897)
Hottentotta polystictus (Pocock, 1896)
Hottentotta rugiscutis (Pocock, 1897)
Hottentotta saulcyi (Simon, 1880)
Hottentotta saxinatans Lowe, 2010
Hottentotta scaber (Ehrenberg, 1828)
Hottentotta schach (Birula, 1905)
Hottentotta socotrensis (Pocock, 1898)
Hottentotta songi (Lourenço, Qi & Zhu, 2005)
Hottentotta sousai Turiel, 2014
Hottentotta stockwelli Kovařík, 2007
Hottentotta tamulus (Fabricius, 1798)
Hottentotta trailini Kovařík, 2013
Hottentotta trilineatus (Peters, 1861)
Hottentotta ugandaensis Kovařík, 2013
Hottentotta zagrosensis Kovařík, 1997

Disputed species

 Hottentotta syrticus (Borelli, 1914) and Buthotus (=Hottentotta) asimii Amir, Kamaluddin & Khan, 2004 are considered nomina dubia.

General characteristics
They belong to the most colorful species of scorpions. The base color ranges from bright yellow to black, with most species colored in brown or reddish tones. Many species are ornamented by color spots or bands especially on the mesosoma. Coloration may be considerable variable between individuals of the same species or among regional populations.

They show a typical buthid habitus with gracile pedipalp chelae and a moderately thickened metasoma. The vesicle is bulbous and proportionally large in some species. The cephalothorax and mesosoma shows distinct granulation in most species, some are strongly hirsute. The tergites of the mesosoma bear three distinct, longitudinal carinae (ridges).

Toxicity
As in other buthids the venom in at least some species of Hottentotta is relatively potent and can be of medical importance to humans.

H. tamulus, the Indian red scorpion, has evidently caused human fatalities by cardiovascular and pulmonary manifestations of intoxication and is considered the most lethal scorpion species in the world.

Kleber et al. (1999) listed envenomation by at least four other species as to cause clinically significant symptoms.

This listing is not comprehensive due to lack of data and all species of Hottentotta are potentially highly venomous to humans.
Note that the LD50 value might differ considerably between populations of the same species.

Habitat
Most species live in semi-arid to humid, steppe, savannah and forested environments. Hyperarid deserts are avoided. Some reach considerable topographic altitudes as e.g. in the Atlas Mountains, the Zagros Mountains or at the Hindukush.

In captivity
Due to their relatively colorful appearance Hottentotta species are often kept and bred in captivity. Popular species are H. hottentotta and H. trilineatus. As with other highly venomous buthids keeping these species in captivity is only recommendable to experienced people.

References

External links
 Images of various Hottentotta species: Hottentotta.com

Buthidae
Scorpions of Asia